The Bog Brook Reservoir is a   reservoir in the Croton Watershed in southern New York State, part of the New York City water supply system. It was formed by the damming of Bog Brook, a small tributary of the East Branch of the Croton River. The reservoir was put into service in 1892, making it one of the older in the system.

Its main function is to serve as a storage reservoir for the  East Branch Reservoir, to which it is connected by a tunnel. 

The Bog Brook Reservoir is one of 12 reservoirs in the Croton Watershed.

From the East Branch Reservoir, the water flows into the continuation of the East Branch of the Croton River, then into The Diverting Reservoir, then via the Croton River to the Muscoot Reservoir and the New Croton Reservoir, into the New Croton Aqueduct, and finally to the Jerome Park Reservoir in the Bronx for distribution to New York City.

See also
List of reservoirs and dams in New York

References

External links 
 NYCDEP Water Supply Watersheds-Links to information on reservoirs by system

Croton Watershed
Reservoirs in New York (state)
Protected areas of Putnam County, New York
Reservoirs in Putnam County, New York